Pulo Gadung is a district (kecamatan) of East Jakarta, Indonesia.

Boundaries and position

Its limits are: the Bekasi Timur Raya – I Gusti Ngurah Rai road to the south, the Bekasi Raya road to the east, Perintis Kemerdekaan road to the north, and Jenderal Ahmad Yani road to the west.

The district sits on a northern edge of East Jakarta and it borders Central Jakarta along just over 25% of its boundaries.

Kelurahan (Administrative Villages)
It is divided into seven administrative villages (kelurahan):

List of important places
Cipinang Penitentiary Institution
Jakarta International Velodrome
Jakarta International Equestrian Park
Jakarta State University
Cipinang railway station
Klender railway station
Pulo Gadung Terminal
I3L
tvOne headquarters

Districts of Jakarta
East Jakarta